Nationality words link to articles with information on the nation's poetry or literature (for instance, Irish or France).

Events
March 1 (Saint David's Day) – Welsh ship's surgeon David Samwell, on board HMS Resolution in the Pacific Ocean on the second voyage of James Cook, writes a penillion.

Works published

United Kingdom
 Thomas Chatterton, Poems, Supposed to Have Been Written at Bristol, by Thomas Rowley, and Others, in the Fifteenth Century, published anonymously, edited by Thomas Tyrwhitt; published February 8 (see also Tyrwhitt, A Vindication 1782)
 William Combe:
 The Diaboliad, published anonymously, misdated "1677"; directed at Simon, Lord Irnham
 The First of April; or, The Triumphs of Folly
 Thomas Day, The Desolation of America, published anonymously
 William Dodd, Thoughts in Prison
 William Roscoe, Mount Pleasant, published anonymously
 Thomas Warton, the younger, Poems: A new edition
 Paul Whitehead, Poems and Miscellaneous Compositions

United States
 Anonymous, Song: made on the taking of General Burgoyne, a broadside of 21 four-line verses, published with no information on the place or printer
 Anonymous ("H. I."), Faction: a sketch; or, a summary of the causes of the present most unnatural and indefensible of all  (sic), "Written at New-York, February, 1776", published this year in New York, 8 pages
 Thomas Dawes, The Law Given at Sinai
 Francis Hopkinson, "Camp Ballad"

Other
 Solomon Gessner, works, German-language, Switzerland; in two volumes, published this year and in 1777
 Pierre Le Tourneur, Poésies galliques, translation into French from the original English of James Macpherson's Ossian poems

Births
Death years link to the corresponding "[year] in poetry" article:
 January 27 – Lukijan Mušicki (died 1837), Serbian poet, prose writer and polyglot
 March 14 – John Blair Linn (died 1804), American
 July 27 – Thomas Campbell (died 1844), Scottish poet especially of sentimental poetry dealing with human affairs

Deaths
Birth years link to the corresponding "[year] in poetry" article:
 January 30 – Justus Friedrich Wilhelm Zachariae (born 1726), German writer, translator, editor and composer
 February 3 – Hugh Kelly (born 1739), Irish poet and dramatist
 March 2 – Horace Walpole, Earl of Oxford (born 1717), English art historian, man of letters, antiquarian and politician
 August 26 – Francis Fawkes (born 1720), English poet and translator
 September 24 (bur.) – James Fortescue (born 1716), English
 October 12 (October 1 O.S.) – Alexander Sumarokov (born 1717), Russian poet and dramatist
 December 12 – Albrecht von Haller (born 1708), German
 Christoph Friedrich Wedekind (born 1709), German
 Johann Gottlieb Willamov (born 1736), German

See also

 List of years in poetry
 List of years in literature
 18th century in poetry
 18th century in literature
 French literature of the 18th century
 Sturm und Drang (the conventional translation is "Storm and Stress"; a more literal translation, however, might be "storm and urge", "storm and longing", "storm and drive" or "storm and impulse"), a movement in German literature (including poetry) and music from the late 1760s through the early 1780s
 List of years in poetry
 Poetry

Notes

18th-century poetry
Poetry